The 2015 season is Associação Portuguesa de Desportos' ninety fourth season in existence and the club's first consecutive season in the third level of Brazilian football, also the first in their history. On 20 March, president Ilídio Lico resigned as a president, being replaced by Jorge Manuel Marques Gonçalves.

On 8 April, after a 0–3 away defeat against São Paulo, Portuguesa was again relegated to Campeonato Paulista Série A2 for the third time in its history.

Players

Squad information

Youth players

Appearances and goals

Last updated: 19 October 2015
Source: Match reports in Competitive matches, Soccerway

Goalscorers

Last updated: 19 October 2015
Source: Match reports in Competitive matches

Disciplinary record

As of 19 October 2015
Source: Match reports in Competitive matches
 = Number of bookings;  = Number of sending offs after a second yellow card;  = Number of sending offs by a direct red card.

Managers

Transfers

In

Total spending:  R$ 0.00

Out

Total gaining:  R$ 0.00

Balance
R$ 0.00

Notes

Competitions

Pre-season/Friendlies

Campeonato Paulista

Matches

Copa do Brasil

Campeonato Brasileiro

First phase

League table

Matches

Quarter-finals

References

External links
Official Site 
LusaNews - blog 

2015 season
Associação Portuguesa de Desportos seasons
Brazilian football clubs 2015 season